Murzino (Mırźa) is a rural locality (a village) in Novokiyeshkinsky Selsoviet, Karmaskalinsky District, Bashkortostan, Russia. The population was 172 as of 2010. There are 5 streets.

Geography 
Murzino is located 23 km southeast of Karmaskaly (the district's administrative centre) by road. Mukayevo is the nearest rural locality.

References 

Rural localities in Karmaskalinsky District